Halka is a 1937 Polish musical film directed by Juliusz Gardan and starring Liliana Zielinska, Witold Zacharewicz and Wladyslaw Ladis-Kiepura. It is an adaptation of the 1848 opera Halka composed by Stanisław Moniuszko with a libretto by Włodzimierz Wolski. It was shot at the Falanga Studios in Warsaw.

Main cast
 Liliana Zielinska - Halka 
 Witold Zacharewicz - Janusz 
 Wladyslaw Ladis-Kiepura - Jontek 
 Janina Wilczówna - Zofia 
 Jerzy Leszczyński - Stolnik 
 Stanisław Grolicki - Damazy 
 Leokadia Pancewicz-Leszczynska - Janusz's Mother 
 Boleslaw Bolko - Szlachcic 
 Ludwik Fritsche - Maciej, a servant

Bibliography
 Skaff, Sheila. The Law of the Looking Glass: Cinema in Poland, 1896-1939. Ohio University Press, 2008.

External links

1937 films
1937 musical films
Polish musical films
1930s Polish-language films
Films directed by Juliusz Gardan
Films based on operas
Polish black-and-white films
Films set in the 18th century